The Hastings-Morse House is a historic First Period house in Haverhill, Massachusetts.  The oldest portion of the -story wood-frame house, its central chimney and right-side rooms, were probably built c. 1706 by a man named Hastings.  Left-side rooms and a partial leanto section on the back of the house were added during the 18th century.  The house underwent a major restoration in the late 1957, which included raising the roof on the leanto section.  Another 20th-century addition is the sunroom on the left (west) side of the house.  Evidence of the building's First Period origins is still visible in the right front room.

The house was added to the National Register of Historic Places in 1991.

See also
National Register of Historic Places listings in Essex County, Massachusetts

References

Houses in Haverhill, Massachusetts
Houses on the National Register of Historic Places in Essex County, Massachusetts